The Marussia MR02 is a Formula One racing car designed under the leadership of Marussia's Technical Director Pat Symonds. It made its competitive debut in the 2013 Formula One season where it was driven by debutant drivers Max Chilton and Jules Bianchi, who replaced Luiz Razia, the team's original choice for the seat. The car was launched at the Circuito de Jerez on 5 February, making the MR02 the first car that Marussia (and its predecessor Virgin Racing) has completed in time to start winter testing.

Design

Technical staff changes
After being suspended from the sport for his role in the race-fixing controversy of 2009, Pat Symonds took on the role of consultant to the Marussia team (then known as Virgin Racing) in 2011. His suspension was lifted at the end of the 2012 season, allowing Symonds to actively participate in the development of the MR02. Under his direction, Marussia abandoned the exclusive use of computational fluid dynamics (CFD)—a method developed by former chief designer Nick Wirth—to develop their car, and instead used conventional techniques such as scale models and wind tunnels, with CFD used to complement rather than dominate the design process. In addition, Marussia formed a technical partnership with McLaren Applied Technologies, the technical development arm of Formula One team McLaren and its parent company, to use their wind tunnel facilities.

Energy recovery systems
The MR02 was the first car built by Marussia to use the Kinetic energy recovery system (KERS) device since the system was reintroduced in 2011. The car used a KERS device designed by Williams F1, based on the design that Williams used when they were a customer of Marussia's engine supplier, Cosworth, in 2011.

Exhaust configuration
The car was launched with a partial Coandă effect exhaust system, the concept of which had been developed by other teams throughout the 2012 season. The Coandă system uses the curved bodywork of the car to direct the flow of exhaust gases over the rear diffuser, generating increased downforce.

Competition history
The MR02 made its competitive debut at the 2013 Australian Grand Prix. In difficult conditions, Jules Bianchi and Max Chilton qualified in nineteenth and twentieth place, ahead of their closest rivals, the Caterhams drivers Charles Pic and Giedo van der Garde. Bianchi went on to finish the race in fifteenth place, one lap behind eventual winner Kimi Räikkönen. Chilton finished in seventeenth place, two laps behind Räikkönen. At the next race in Malaysia, Bianchi took advantage of a string of retirements to finish thirteenth overall, once again ahead of the Caterham drivers. Chilton went on to finish sixteenth, as the final classified driver.

The car received its first technical updates at the Chinese Grand Prix, where Bianchi and Chilton finished in fifteenth and seventeenth place respectively, once again ahead of the Caterhams. Charles Pic out-qualified and finished ahead of both MR02s in Bahrain, but the team retained their position in the World Constructors' Championship courtesy of Bianchi's thirteenth-place finish in Malaysia.

The team eventually finished a de facto tenth in the Constructors' Championship, with no points but ahead of Caterham due to a better finishing record.

Complete Formula One results
(key) (results in bold indicate pole position; results in italics indicate fastest lap)

References

External links

 Marussia F1 — the official site

Marussia Formula One cars